Ruksana Osman is Professor and Deputy Vice-Chancellor at the University of the Witwatersrand, Johannesburg, South Africa. Before then, she was the Dean of the Faculty of Humanities at the University of the Witwatersrand, Johannesburg, South Africa. She is also the former Head of the School of Education at the University of the Witwatersrand. She is an elected member of the Academy of Science, South Africa.

Career
Osman's expertise is in Higher Education, Research Led Teacher Education and Teaching and Learning in Higher Education. Her focus is on equity, access and success in teacher and higher education. She has authored three books. She also serves as convenor of the UNESCO Research Chair in Teacher Education for Diversity and Development.

External links
  on Google Scholar
  on ResearchGate
 on ORCID

References

Year of birth missing (living people)
South African scientists
21st-century women scientists
Humanities academics
Academic staff of the University of the Witwatersrand
Members of the Academy of Science of South Africa
Living people